USS Inca (ID-3219) was a tugboat acquired by the U.S. Navy during World War I. She was assigned to the Parris Island, South Carolina, Marine barracks. She served until 1 February 1919.

Constructed in Camden, New Jersey 

The fourth ship to be so named, Inca, an iron tug, was built in 1879 by J. H. Dialogue & Sons, Camden, New Jersey; and acquired by the Navy 31 July 1918. She commissioned 2 August 1918.

World War I service 

The tug was assigned to the 6th Naval District, headquartered at Charleston, South Carolina, and operated until after World War I ended at Parris Island Marine Barracks, South Carolina.

Post-war disposition 

She was stricken from the Navy List 1 February 1919.

References 
 

World War I auxiliary ships of the United States
Tugs of the United States Navy
Ships built by Dialogue & Company
1879 ships